PMB is a fully featured open source integrated library system. It is continuously developed and maintained by the French company PMB Services.

Features 

PMB follows the rules of the library science. The software provides 4 essential features : 
 the library management, 
 the watch and the documentary products, 
 the publication of editorial content 
 the electronic document management.

It provides an integrated portal of news and management of Web 2.0 content and is the only ILS that doesn't use a third-party CMS for the management of the portal.

It is multilingual (100% English & French, 80% Spanish and Italian) and even supports Arabic (translation and UTF8 support) since its 3.0.5 version of November 2006. The latest 4.2 version of July 2015 includes a watch unit (Watch&Share) and allows geo-referencing of the collections and several other improvements to the software.

Size 

The software is used with collections up to around 500 000 records. Tests are done with 2 million records to show its capacity to manage bigger collections. It is regularly installed in public libraries networks of 10 to 15 sites.

Interoperability 

PMB allows to use the Z39.50 protocol (in order to import bibliographic records that can be directly integrated in the database from different servers). It manages the UNIMARC cataloguing format and the ISO 2709 record exchange format. It also includes the XML data format. PMB is also OAI server and client. The user's database can be connected to an LDAP directory or any other base of users reachable by web services. It has an API allowing to integrate it into an existing information system. The integration of PMB into a Virtual Learning Environment (VLE) is functional in many French academies.

Units/Modules 

PMB is divided in two modules: the management module and the portal module (or OPAC). The management module includes specific functions for the librarian: circulation (loan/return), catalogue, authorities, editions, SDI (Selective Dissemination of the Information and the watch module Watch&Share), acquisitions, CMS and administration. PMB comes with a user request management feature since 2009. It can, moreover, be completed by the preset addition of an extensions module. At the start, the software was providing a specialized user interface on the catalogue : the OPAC. An improvement to the software in 2012 added a CMS feature offering the ability to make highly customizable portals.

Requirements 
It is a web application, based on a web server platform (Apache, Microsoft IIS) + PHP + MySQL or MariaDB, which can therefore work on Linux, Mac OS X or Microsoft Windows .

PMB has its own search engine, supporting phonetic searches without needing any complementary search engine.

PMB is written using PHP programming language. It requires:

 PHP
 Apache web server
 MySQL database
 Web browser

Documentary languages 
PMB can integrate different sorting plans: DEWEY, UDC, PCDM or any other custom sorting plan. It includes the management of several thesauri, a feature that is actually in use with thesauri such as: PRISME, BDSP, MOTBIS, DELPHES, Thesaurus du Management, Vie culturelle, etc. It comes with a management of concepts allowing it to respect the ISO 25964-1 standard and therefore the use of indexation languages like RAMEAU or MeSH. It also allows the total implementation of the FRBR model.

Users 
PMB is used by big institutions such as local communities, ministries, the constitutional council, regional councils, metro-poles, the Academy of Rennes and every documentation center of Brittany.

Many public libraries networks, secondary schools, the ONISEP (a French work and study information institute) and the INSEE have chosen the software PMB.

The group Radio France has joined the community of PMB users in 2015 for an FRBR migration of its library (including musical partitions).

PMB also equips private groups such as law offices, Grandes écoles, internationally known fashion groups etc.

According to the annual survey of Livres-Hebdo, PMB was the third Integrated library system in France in 2005 in terms of number of installations with 165 installations. Next years' surveys showed the fast progression of the free software in many structures. Since 2011, PMB Services refuses to take part to this survey : the numbers given to Marc Maisonneuve weren't correctly reused and there was an amalgam made with the software BCDI, yet not a free software.

On 1 January 2015, there was more than 6 000 operational installations in the world, for collections sizes going from 300 records to 500 000. Big companies such as Alstom or Orange S.A. now use more free solutions such as PMB. Since 2012, the software is running in a higher education network in Belgium, HENAM-HENALLUX, with more than 400 000 online searchable records.

In France, PMB Services claims to have more than 1 800 clients. The  company's official website lists most of them and links their online catalogues.

History 
In its early beta versions, the software was called PhpMyBibli. It has been launched by François Lemarchand (director of the Library of Agneaux) in October 2002. The cataloguing and the application's base have been created during the autumn 2002, followed a bit later by the serials management module. In 2003, Eric Robert, an IT engineer fighting for the free software joins PMB founder François Lemarchand. He then develops the loan module, the Unimarc imports, the statistic files and the Z39.50 client. It is in December 2003, for a presentation at an international conference in Rabat that the 1.0 version was released. PMB then officially becomes an integrated library system (ILS). The OPAC (the user interface) appeared this year too, developed by Gautier Michelin and Christophe Bliard. The most involved developers at this date (Eric Robert, Gautier Michelin and Florent Tétart) then created the company PMB Services to professionalize the software and to offer the services necessary for interested libraries or companies. The society provides services like training and installation of the software (local or hosted) along with all the support services needed to implement the software: local installation or SaaS mode, migration or recovery of data, set up, training, construction and design of the portal. The first library to be equipped with PMB was the library of Bueil-en-Touraine (in France). The version 4.1 has been downloaded more than 38 000 times. The 4.2 is available since 24 July 2015 and has been downloaded 2272 times on 15 September.

Development 

PMB was initially licensed under GNU General Public License, which ensures the free availability of the software. Wiki, mailing lists and BerliOS hosting facilities allow communication between PMB developers and users. PMB is now licensed under CECILL free licence, that ensures legal security in France and other countries with similar legal systems.

See also 

 List of free and open source software packages

Notes

References

External links
PMB Website
 PMB Forge Website
Bibliography

Library automation
PHP software
Free library and information science software